Ice Lake Rebels is an American reality TV show about houseboat dwellers in Great Slave Lake.

It aired on Animal Planet for two seasons, 2014 to 2016. The show was produced by Critical Content of Los Angeles, and aired on Animal Planet.  The producer was Kathryn Haydn Hays.

Critics from The New York Times and the Boston Herald mainly commented on the difficult conditions depicted in the show, praising the characters' determination but not much else.

References

External links
 Official Animal Planet website
 

2014 American television series debuts
Television shows set in Canada
Animal Planet original programming